The Transitional Legislative Council of Sudan ( al majlis al tashrieiu al aintiqaliu al sudaniu) is an interim legislative body to be formed in Sudan as part of the 2019–2024 Sudanese transition to democracy.

Background
Following a coup d'état in April 2019, both houses of the National Legislature of Sudan were dissolved and a Transitional Military Council was formed. In July 2019, the Transitional Military Council and the Forces of Freedom and Change coalition of civil society organisations agreed a constitutional declaration for a transition to an elected government in 2022. Under the terms of this agreement, a transitional government is to be appointed and a Transitional Legislative Council is to be formed.

Composition
Under the terms of the constitutional declaration, the Transitional Legislative Council is to be formed within three months of the declaration entering into force. The Forces of Freedom and Change (FFC) group will nominate two-thirds of the members of the council with the remaining third appointed by "other forces". The council is to have no more than 300 members of which a minimum of 40% should be women. Members of the National Congress Party are not permitted to be members of the council. Other criteria for membership are being a Sudanese national, at least 21 years old, not having been convicted of a criminal offence, possessing integrity and competence and being able to read and write.

Lebanese academic Gilbert Achcar credits the No to Oppression against Women Initiative and Women of Sudanese Civic and Political Groups for having been influential in obtaining the 40% quota for women.

In November 2019, the FFC stated that the distribution of seats would be proportional to the population distribution, "taking into account the representation of all communities in Sudan". Following the signing of a peace agreement signed on 31 August 2020 between the Transitional Government of Sudan and rebel factions in Darfur, South Kordofan and Blue Nile State, a quarter of seats on the council will be reserved for the members of those factions.

See also
Sudanese Revolution

References

Government of Sudan
 
Sudan
Sudan
Sudanese Revolution